Runella zeae  is a Gram-negative bacterium from the genus of Runella which has been isolated from the stem of the mais plant Zea mays in Madison in the United States.

References

External links
Type strain of Runella zeae at BacDive -  the Bacterial Diversity Metadatabase	

Cytophagia
Bacteria described in 2002